Arvid Gustavsson Sparre, born 1245 in Vik, Balingsta and died in 1317 (at Nyköping Banquet). He was Lord of Ekholmen in Veckholm, Uppland, Sweden. He had in his Coat of Arms, a spar, which has retrospectively dubbed all the family named in genealogies as Sparre of Vik. He was the councillor of Eric, Duke of Södermanland and Valdemar of Finland.

Father was Gustaf Knutsson Sparre (Born 1222, Adelsö, Sweden), Grandfather was Knut Sixtensson Sparre (Born 1190, Adelsö, Sweden), Great grandfather was Sixten Sixtensson Sparre (born 1165 in Tofta, Uppsala, Sweden)
Married with Ramborg Israelsdotter And.
Child, Gustav Arvidsson, became knight and member of the Privy Council of Sweden, justiciar of Södermanland.
His grandson is known as Arvid Gustavsson, Lord of Vik.
Arvid also had a child named Gisles Arvidsson Sparre with Helena (Elin) Magnusdotter Sture.

Sources
Äldre svenska frälsesläkter, by Folke Wernstedt, 1965
https://web.archive.org/web/20070927093311/http://www.artursson.se/0002/2744.htm

Lawspeakers
1245 births
1317 deaths